The 2016–17 EHF Cup is the 36th edition of the EHF Cup, the second most important European handball club competition organised by the European Handball Federation (EHF), and the fifth edition since the merger with the EHF Cup Winners' Cup.

Team allocation

Federation ranking
For the 2016–17 EHF Cup, the national federations were allocated places according to their 2016–17 EHF country ranking, which takes into account their performance in European competitions from 2012–13 to 2014–15.

Apart from the allocation based on the country coefficients, federations may have more or less teams participating in the EHF Cup, as noted below:
 – Additional berth for 2015–16 EHF Cup title holders
 – Berth transferred from or to 2016–17 EHF Champions League
 – Berth transferred from 2016–17 EHF Challenge Cup

Distribution

Teams
The labels in the parentheses show how each team qualified for the place of its starting round:
TH: Title holders
1st, 2nd, 3rd, 4th, 5th, 6th, etc.: League position
CW: Domestic cup winners
CR: Domestic cup runners-up
CL QS: Losers from the Champions League qualification stage.

Notes

Round and draw dates
The schedule of the competition was follows (all draws were held at the EHF headquarters in Vienna, Austria):

Qualification stage
The qualification stage consists of three rounds, which are played as two-legged ties using a home-and-away system. In the draws for each round, teams are allocated into two pots, with teams from Pot 1 facing teams from Pot 2. The winners of each pairing (highlighted in bold) qualify for the following round.

For each round, teams listed first played the first leg at home. In some cases, teams agreed to play both matches at the same venue.

Round 1
A total of 30 teams entered the draw for the first qualification round, which was held on Tuesday, 19 July 2016. The draw seeding pots were composed as follows:

The first legs were played on 2–3 September and the second legs were played on 4 and 10–11 September 2015.

Notes

1 Both legs were hosted by Handball Käerjeng.
2 Both legs were hosted by Maccabi Rishon LeZion.
3 Both legs were hosted by B.B. Ankaraspor.
4 Both legs were hosted by AC Diomidis Argous.
5 Both legs were hosted by FC Porto.
6 Both legs were hosted by RK Prilep 2010.

Round 2
A total of 32 teams entered the draw for the second qualifying round, which was held after the draw for the first qualifying round on Tuesday, 19 July 2016. The draw seeding pots were composed as follows:

The first legs were played on 8–9 October and the second legs were played on 9 and 15–16 October 2016.

Notes
1 Order of legs reversed
2 Both legs were hosted by ZTR Zaporizhia.
3 Both legs were hosted by Górnik Zabrze.

Round 3
A total of 32 teams entered the draw for the third qualifying round, which was held on Tuesday, 18 October 2016. The draw seeding pots were composed as follows: 

The first legs were played on 18–20 and 23 November and the second legs were played on 25–27 November 2016.

Notes
1 Order of legs reversed

Group stage

Draw and format
The draw of the EHF Cup group stage took place on Thursday, 1 December 2016. The 16 teams allocated into four pots were drawn into four groups of four teams. The country protection rule was applied, i.e. two clubs from the same country could not face each other in the same group.

In each group, teams play against each other home-and-away in a round-robin format. The matchdays are 11–12 February, 17–19 February, 4–5 March, 11–12 March, 25–26 March, and 1–2 April 2017.

If two or more teams are equal on points on completion of the group matches, the following criteria are applied to determine the rankings (in descending order):
number of points in matches of all teams directly involved;
goal difference in matches of all teams directly involved;
higher number of plus goals in matches of all teams directly involved;
goal difference in all matches of the group;
higher number of plus goals in all matches of the group;

If no ranking can be determined, a decision shall be obtained by drawing lots. Lots shall be drawn by the EHF, if possible in the presence of a responsible of each club.

Seeding
On 28 November 2016, EHF announced the composition of the group stage seeding pots.

Group A

Group B

Group C

Group D

Ranking of the second-placed teams
Because the German side Frisch Auf Göppingen, the organizers of the Final 4 tournament, finished on top of their group they qualified directly to the final tournament and only the top three second-placed teams qualified to the quarter-finals.  The ranking of the second-placed teams was determined on the basis of  the team's results in the group stage.

Knockout stage

Quarter-finals

Final four

See also
2016–17 EHF Champions League
2016–17 EHF Challenge Cup
2016–17 Women's EHF Cup

References

External links
EHF Cup (official website)

EHF Cup seasons
EHF Cup
EHF Cup